Jiuli District was a suburban subdivision of Xuzhou, Jiangsu province, China. The district was named after a mountain lying within it.

In 1965, the district was established and designated "Mining District" for administering numerous coal and iron ore mines. It was renamed Jiuli in 1995, and its southeastern part, western part and the rest were merged into Gulou, Quanshan, Tongshan respectively in 2010.

References

www.xzqh.org 

County-level divisions of Jiangsu
Administrative divisions of Xuzhou